Sukhobizyarka is a rural locality (a settlement) in Palnikovskoye Rural Settlement, Permsky District, Perm Krai, Russia. The population was 199 as of 2010. There are 6 streets.

Geography 
Sukhobizyarka is located 76 km south of Perm (the district's administrative centre) by road. Bizyar is the nearest rural locality.

References 

Rural localities in Permsky District